Prabhat Sangeet is a collection of Bengali poetry by poet Prabhat Ranjan Sarkar. The book was first published in 1883 and was followed by Tagore's earlier work Sandhya Sangeet (1882). This works also marks the end of the second stage of Rabindranath Tagore's poetic career.

Theme 
In this book the poet celebrated the nature and joyousness of the world. He also resvisited his childhood. Tagore explained: "At last one day, I do not know how, the bolted door was broken open and I got back what I had lost. I did not merely get it back but through the barrier of separation, got a fuller idea of it. That is why I got much mom when in the Prabhat Sangeet, I got back the world of my childhood. Thus easy access to nature followed by separation and reunion marked the end of an episode in the first chapter of my life."

References 

Poetry collections by Rabindranath Tagore
Bengali_poetry
1883_poems
1883 books